Jorge Tupinambá dos Santos (born 16 March 1944 – 18 September 2017) is a former Brazilian professional football player and manager.

References

External links
¿QuÉ PASÓ con... JOrge Tupinambá ?Su perfil y triunfos - El Diario de Hoy 

1944 births
Living people
Brazilian footballers
C.D. Águila footballers
Expatriate footballers in El Salvador
Brazilian football managers
C.D. Luis Ángel Firpo managers
Expatriate football managers in El Salvador
Expatriate football managers in Honduras
El Salvador national football team managers
Antigua GFC managers
Association footballers not categorized by position
Footballers from Rio de Janeiro (city)